The Nikon D4S is a full frame professional DSLR camera announced by Nikon Corporation on February 25, 2014 to succeed the D4 as its flagship DSLR. The D4S offers a number of improvements over its predecessor including a new image sensor, new image processor, new battery, improved ergonomics and expanded ISO range. Additionally, improved auto focus (AF) algorithms and a new AF Tracking mode were introduced together with a new option of RAW image capture in full resolution (16MP) or a "Small" file (4MP).

In May 2014, the D4S received a Technical Image Press Association (TIPA) 2014 Award in the category of "Best Digital SLR Professional". In August 2014, the D4S received a European Imaging and Sound Association (EISA) award in the category "European Professional DSLR Camera 2014-2015".

The D4S was superseded by the Nikon D5, announced on January 5, 2016.

The D4S was discontinued in December 2016.

Features
While the D4S retains many features of the Nikon D4, it offers the following new features and improvements:
 Redesigned 16.2-megapixel image sensor with less noise
 New Expeed 4 image processor 
 New Group-area Autofocus mode, allowing five focus points to be grouped for subject tracking
 Exposure smoothing during timelapse recording
 Expanded ISO range of ISO 100–25,600 (boosted range of ISO 50-409,600)
 Gigabit Ethernet port for data transfer and tethered shooting
 Full HD (1920 × 1080) 60p video capture with uncompressed video output via HDMI
 Improved autofocus and subject tracking algorithms
 Improved mirror mechanism, increasing continuous shooting speed to 11fps with AF
 Improved EN-EL18a battery with higher capacity for increased battery life of approximately 3000 shots

References

External links

Official Nikon press release
Nikon D4s vs. D4 specifications comparison
Nikon D4s user's manual Nikon

D4S
D4S
Live-preview digital cameras
Cameras introduced in 2014
Full-frame DSLR cameras